Kundanapu Bomma is a 2016 Telugu language film directed by Vara Mullapoodi. It stars Chandini Chowdary, Sudhakar Komakula and Sudheer Varma.

Cast
Chandini Chowdary as Suchi
Sudhakar Komakula as Gopi
Sudheer Varma as Vasu
Shakalaka Shankar
Ajay Ghosh
Nagineedu
Rajeev Kanakala

Reviews
The Times of India gave the film two out of five stars stating, "In all, there are but a few light moments in the movie that will make you chuckle". The Hindu gave the film one out of five stars stating, "Stale and silly".

This title of this movie is taken from a song in “Ye Maaya Chesave” sung by Benny Dayal & Kalyani Menon.

References

External links 
 

2010s Telugu-language films